Gaby Deslys (born Marie-Elise-Gabrielle Caire, 4 November 1881 – 11 February 1920) was a singer and actress during the early 20th century. She selected her name for her stage career, and it is a contraction of Gabrielle of the Lillies. During the 1910s she was exceedingly popular worldwide, making $4,000 a week in the United States alone. She performed several times on Broadway, at the Winter Garden Theater, and performed in a show with a young Al Jolson. Her dancing was so popular that The Gaby Glide was named for her.

Renowned for her beauty, she was courted by several wealthy gentlemen including King Manuel II of Portugal. She eventually made the leap to silent films, making her only U.S. film Her Triumph with Famous Players-Lasky in 1915. She would make a handful of films in France before her death. In 1919 she contracted Spanish influenza and underwent several operations trying to cure a throat infection caused by the disease. She died from complications of the infection in Paris in 1920, at the age of 38.

Early life
Deslys had many admirers among royalty, most notably King Manuel II of Portugal, and her origins became the subject of dispute. A private detective claimed her true name was Hadiwga Nawrati or Hedvika Navrátilová and that she was a Czech peasant girl, born in the village of Horní Moštěnice, then part of Austria-Hungary. The investigator reported that Deslys had denied her alleged mother's claim to kinship when he brought her to see the dancer, paying her a large amount of money to leave. Deslys replied that the story was ridiculous and that she was French, not Czech.

After Deslys' death, at least two dozen persons with the surnames Navratil/Navratilová attempted to claim her fortune. In January 1930, the French foreign minister said he had settled the dispute about Deslys' birthplace and origins. According to him, Deslys had been born in Marseilles on 4 November 1881, daughter of Hippolyte Caire and his wife, Mathilde (née Terras). This study found that the claim of the Navrátil family was incorrect and was based on their daughter's being a look-alike of Gabrielle Caire, who later adopted the stage name Gaby Deslys.

Career

Dancer
Deslys rose in popularity in dance halls around Paris and London. She was a practitioner of several types of dance such as the Ju-Jitsu waltz, Ballroom, Grizzly Bear, Turkey Trot and her most famous The Gaby Glide. Her appearance at the Liverpool Olympia was also well received. She had been to the United States where she had earned $4,000 per week. She was dedicated to the art of dancing. At least a part of her popularity was a result of her desire to please the audiences who came to watch her perform. 

While she was dancing at the Hyperion Theater at Yale University, in November 1911, students rushed the stage. The Yale News had complained about ticket prices for the production being raised to $2. The performance followed the Yale - Princeton University football game played earlier the same day. The inflated price of admission is thought to have triggered the students to pull the seats to pieces and proceed with the outbreak. Deslys retreated to her room while stage hands used fire extinguishers to subdue the students. The same month Deslys performed at the Winter Garden Theater in a production of Vera Violetta. In 1913 Deslys appeared with Al Jolson (in blackface) in the musical comedy The Honeymoon Express.

On a number of occasions she appeared at the Grand Casino in Marseilles. Her final performance there was in 1919. Her passion for Marseilles was matched by her animosity toward her critics among French editors. One of her most prominent detractors was Ernest Charles. She sued him for 50,000 francs in August 1912. She at first considered hiring a groom to horsewhip Charles before her lawyer advised against it. 

During the early decades of the last century, her likeness adorned many cigarette trading cards issued in the United States and United Kingdom that were dedicated to series on ‘beauties’ or famous actresses and dancers.

Singer
In 1910 Deslys recorded two songs in Paris, "Tout en Rose" and "Philomene". Both were released on phonograph by HMV and are still available. Another song, "La Parisienne" was recorded at the same time but rejected for an unknown reason, and thus never released.

Films
She began her movie career in 1914 with Rosy Rapture, a short film based on the play of the same name in which she had appeared in England. This film according to IMDb had a scene with George Bernard Shaw in it. Her American feature film debut came in 1915 with Her Triumph costarring her dancer boyfriend Harry Pilcer. The film was presented by Daniel Frohman and produced by Famous Players-Lasky. Her Triumph featured Deslys doing one of her famous dances with Pilcer. The film is lost but surviving stills show a scene with Deslys and Pilcer in Daniel Blum's Pictorial History of the Silent Film, as well as the intro card with Deslys' picture in the credits. She made only two more French silent films in 1918 and 1919, both with Harry Pilcer in the cast, before getting the illness that would take her life.

Personal life

Deslys' celebrity rose following newspaper stories which gossiped about King Manuel II of Portugal's infatuation with her. During the king's visit to Paris in December 1909, he was introduced to Deslys and immediately began a relationship with her.

It was thought that after this first meeting the King sent Deslys a pearl necklace worth $70,000. Their relationship was anything but discreet (she would arrive before night at the Palácio das Necessidades and would pass through Portugal unnoticed); abroad, meanwhile, they were on the front pages of newspapers in Europe and North America, especially after he was deposed in 1910. 

In public interviews, usually on trips, Deslys never negated the obvious, but always refused to comment on her relationship with the deposed king. After his exile, they would continue to meet, especially while she had stage engagements in London.

When Deslys moved to New York, in the summer of 1911, their relationship cooled off; Deslys became involved with a fellow stage actor Harry Pilcer, and Manuel married in 1913. Despite this, she maintained her contacts with Manuel's personal secretary, the Marquês of Lavradio. 

Deslys and Pilcer became a successful dance act duo during the First World War on a par with the Castles, but it is unclear if they ever legally married.

Death and legacy

 
Deslys contracted a severe throat infection caused by the Spanish flu pandemic in December 1919. She was operated on multiple times in an effort to eradicate the infection, on two occasions without the use of an anesthetic. Surgeons were inhibited by Deslys' demand that they must not scar her neck.

She died in Paris in February 1920. In her will, Deslys left her villa on the Marseilles Corniche Road, and all of her property in Marseilles, to the poor of Marseilles. The property was valued at $500,000.

According to the Pittsburgh Press on July 18, 1920: "In an adjoining room was the exquisite bed that belonged to the celebrated Dutchess de Fontanges--one of several beds of equal historical value which Gaby used in rotation. In cabinets about her were Limoges enamels that had been the joy of great King Francis I. On the walls were paintings by Botticelli and other early Italian masters. On the book shelves were priceless volumes printed by Elzevir and Aldus Manutius."

Her  was inspired by the boat in the "Grotto of Venus" scene from the opera "Tannhauser". On its bow, there are two  with images from Boucher's "Cupid's Target". The bed was bought at auction in Marseilles by Metro Pictures. It was used in the 1922 film Trifling Women, starring Barbara La Marr. Later, it came into the possession of the Universal Studios prop department, and it was used in the 1925 film The Phantom of the Opera.  In 1934, it was used as Lily Garland's bed in Twentieth Century and in 1950, it was in Sunset Boulevard as the bed of Norma Desmond. In 1964, it appeared in a dream sequence in the film "Good Neighbor Sam".

In 1943, her life story was bought by MGM as a potential film property for Judy Garland to be produced by Arthur Freed, but it was shelved after a few script treatments.

She was portrayed humorously by the ballerina Tamara Toumanova in the Sigmund Romberg biopic Deep in My Heart (1954), directed by Stanley Donen.

In 1986 James Gardiner wrote a biography of Deslys' life, titled Gaby Deslys: A Fatal Attraction.

Filmography

(all are believed to be lost films)
La remplaçante (short film, 1914)
Her Triumph (1915, only American film)
Rosy Rapture (1915)
Infatuation (*aka Bouclette) (1918) 
Le Dieu du hasard (1921)

Theatre
The Revue of Revues (27 September 1911 - 11 November 1911)
Vera Violetta (20 November 1911 - 24 February 1912)
The Honeymoon Express (6 February 1913 - 14 June 1913)
The Belle of Bond Street (30 March 1914 - 9 May 1914)
Stop! Look! Listen! (25 December 1915 - 25 March 1916)

Discography
Philomene (1910, HMV)
Tout en Rose (1910, HMV)
La Parisienne (Unreleased, 1910)

References

Further reading
 Gardiner, James; Gaby Deslys: A Fatal Attraction (Sidgwick & Jackson Ltd, 1986); 
  Smith, Angela K. and Krista Cowman, editors; Landscapes and Voices of the Great War (Routledge, 2017); ; 
  Slide, Anthony; The Encyclopedia of Vaudeville (Greenwood Press, 1994; University Press of Mississippi, 2012); ; ASIN: B00E7V0VXE

External links

 
Gaby Deslys photo gallery at NY Public Library Billy Rose Theater Collection
Gaby Deslys and Harry Pilcer, June 1915, gettyimages.com; accessed 6 May 2014.

1881 births
1920 deaths
French female dancers
French stage actresses
French film actresses
French silent film actresses
French musical theatre actresses
Actresses from Marseille
Deaths from Spanish flu
Infectious disease deaths in France
20th-century French actresses
20th-century French women singers